Jessica Anne Delgado Miclat (born October 8, 1998) is a professional footballer who last played as a midfielder for Aris Limassol. She currently plays for Eskilstuna United DFF. Born in the United States, she represents the Philippines women's national team.

Early life
Miclat grew up in the United States and was born to a Mexican mother and a Filipino father who hailed from Sampaloc, Manila in the Philippines. She was born in Pomona, California but considers Ontario, another city in the same state as her hometown and has two older brothers.

Playing career

Collegiate 
She played collegiate football, or soccer as it is called in the country. She played for the women's team of the UC Irvine Anteaters of the University of California, Irvine. She made 73 appearances for the team scoring a total of six goals from 2016 to 2019. In her senior team she was named part of the 2019 All Big West First team.

Club 
In February 2021, Miclat was signed in to play for Danish club AaB Kvinder of the Elitedivisionen. Prior to signing up with AaB Kvinder, Miclat had negotiations with clubs in Spain, Belgium, Iceland, and Norway. She moved to Cyprus in September 2021 to play for Aris Limassol.

International 
Jessica Miclat has also played for the Philippines women's national team in the 2018 AFC Women's Asian Cup.

International goals 
Scores and results list the Philippines' goal tally first.

Honours

International

Philippines
Southeast Asian Games third place: 2021
AFF Women's Championship: 2022

References

1998 births
Living people
Citizens of the Philippines through descent
Filipino women's footballers
Women's association football midfielders
Philippines women's international footballers
Filipino expatriate footballers
Filipino expatriate sportspeople in Denmark
Expatriate women's footballers in Denmark
Filipino people of Mexican descent
Sportspeople of Mexican descent
Sportspeople from Pomona, California
Soccer players from California
American women's soccer players
University of California, Irvine alumni
UC Irvine Anteaters women's soccer players
Expatriate women's footballers in Cyprus
American expatriate women's soccer players
American expatriate sportspeople in Cyprus
American expatriate sportspeople in Denmark
American sportspeople of Filipino descent
American sportspeople of Mexican descent
Southeast Asian Games bronze medalists for the Philippines
Southeast Asian Games medalists in football
Competitors at the 2021 Southeast Asian Games